Jean McGrath (born December 23, 1935) is a former member of the Arizona House of Representatives. A Republican, she served in the House from January 1995 through January 2001, representing district 17. She ran for a fourth term in 2000, but lost in the Republican primary.

References

Living people
20th-century American politicians
21st-century American politicians
20th-century American women politicians
21st-century American women politicians
Republican Party members of the Arizona House of Representatives
People from Muskegon, Michigan
People from Glendale, Arizona
1935 births